Grâce Zaadi Deuna (born 7 July 1993) is a French handball player for CSM București and the French national team.

She represented France at the 2013 World Women's Handball Championship and 2016 Olympics.

Individual awards
Championnat de France Best Playmaker: 2018
All-Star Team as Best Playmaker at the Olympic Games: 2020
All-Star team as Best Playmaker at the World Championship: 2017, 2021

References

External links

1993 births
Living people
French sportspeople of Cameroonian descent
French female handball players
Olympic handball players of France
Olympic medalists in handball
Olympic silver medalists for France
Medalists at the 2016 Summer Olympics
Handball players at the 2016 Summer Olympics
European champions for France
Expatriate handball players
French expatriate sportspeople in Russia
French expatriate sportspeople in Romania
Handball players at the 2020 Summer Olympics
Medalists at the 2020 Summer Olympics
Olympic gold medalists for France